MacArthur Station may refer to:

 MacArthur station (BART), Oakland, California, United States
 Macarthur railway station, Campbelltown, New South Wales, Australia